Anthony Sullivan may refer to:

 Anthony Sullivan (rugby) (born 1968), Welsh former professional rugby player
 Anthony Sullivan (pitchman) (born 1969), English producer and pitchman known as "The OxiClean Man"
 Tony Sullivan (born 1949), former Australian rules footballer

See also
 Anthony O'Sullivan (1855–1920), American silent film actor and director
 Tony O'Sullivan (born 1966), Irish former hurler